Sasbach may refer to two towns in Baden-Württemberg, Germany:

Sasbach (Ortenau), in the Ortenau district
Sasbach am Kaiserstuhl, in the district of Emmendingen